Helena Squires, née Strong (1879 - 1959) was a Newfoundland politician born in Little Bay Islands.

Biography
Lady Helena E. Squires (née Strong) was born in Little Bay Islands, Newfoundland in 1879. She became the first woman to stand for and win a seat in the Newfoundland and Labrador (formerly Newfoundland) House of Assembly, in the 1930 by-election as the Member for the District of Lewisporte. She was the wife of the prime minister of the Dominion of Newfoundland (Sir Richard Anderson Squires) and was a mother of seven children.  She attended The St. John's Methodist College and Mount Allison University where she was trained to be a teacher. She was also a social activist who worked to found a teachers school and a maternity hospital.  She was elected  in 1930 in a by-election and lost her seat in 1932.

One of her sons, named after her husband, Richard Anderson Squires, served with Lord Strathcona's Horse regiment in the Canadian army during the Second World War. He was killed on June 17, 1942 at Headley Downs, England. The 31-year-old Lieutenant had been riding on the outside of his tank during manoeuvres in order to direct his driver when the tank lurched, throwing him forward and under the track of the moving tank.

When Newfoundland joined Confederation in 1949, Lady Squires was elected the first president of the provincial Liberal Association a position she held until 1958. She died in 1959 at her retirement home in Toronto.

See also
Women's Suffrage in Newfoundland

References

1879 births
1959 deaths
Women in Newfoundland and Labrador politics
Members of the Newfoundland and Labrador House of Assembly
Dominion of Newfoundland politicians